Paul Laurence Dunbar High School (PLD), also known as Dunbar High School, is a public high school located at 1600 Man o' War Boulevard on the southwest side of Lexington, Kentucky, United States. The school is one of six high schools in the Fayette County Public Schools district.

The school was opened in 1990. With an enrollment of over 2100 students (in 2008–2009), it is one of the largest public high schools in Kentucky, It also houses the Math, Science, and Technology Center. The PLD student body, unlike that of most of the other schools named after Dunbar, has a substantial white majority, although African Americans and Hispanics make up roughly one sixth of the students.

About 
Since opening in 1990, Dunbar has averaged more than 15 National Merit Semifinalists a year, with 71 in the last four years.  Of the Class of 2008, 75% continued on to four-year colleges or universities, with another 17% attending two-year colleges or technical schools. As of 2017, Dunbar offers Advanced Placement (AP) courses in twenty subject areas.

Academic team 
The PLD academic team has won numerous, including Governor's Cup championships in 2000 and 2001. In 2000, Dunbar's United States Academic Decathlon team won the state division for the first time and proceeded to nationals.

Math, Science, and Technology Center 
The Math, Science, and Technology Center, also known as MSTC, is a magnet program housed in Paul Laurence Dunbar High School. The program accepts 55 students each year, selected from the 2500 incoming high school freshmen in Fayette County.

History

Pre-history (1922–1967) 
The Dunbar High School was a segregated public high school for African-American students founded in 1922, and located at 545 North Upper Street in the Northside neighborhood in Lexington. It was named after the 19th century African-American poet and writer, Paul Laurence Dunbar, whose parents were from Kentucky. The Bearcats were the schools mascot, and the school colors were red and black (and green and white during the 1940s). In 1953, the Russell School, another segregated public school for African American students, was located on the same block and they shared a field.

When Fayette County's schools integrated, Dunbar High was closed in 1967, with its students being bused to four previously segregated white schools. 

The building of the original high school at 545 North Upper Street has since been converted to the Dunbar Community Center, which serves myriad cultural, educational and recreational needs for the city of Lexington. The Dunbar Community Center is operated by the city's department of Parks and Recreation.

Paul Laurence Dunbar High School (1990) 
The Paul Laurence Dunbar High School is a public high school opened in 1990 and located at 1600 Man o' War Boulevard in the southeastern part of Lexington. The school name was part of a political deal made in 1965 with the city's African-American community. The county school board agreed that the next high school to open in Lexington would bear Dunbar's name, principally at the urging of the Rev. William Augustus Jones Sr., minister of Lexington's oldest and largest Black church and a civil rights leader whose five oldest children had graduated from Dunbar and embarked on careers of distinction. 

Both schools used the name Paul Laurence Dunbar High School and the Dunbar High School, but they are not the same school. The former school was frequently referred to as the "Dunbar High School". In an attempt to differentiated, the new school was given the poet's full name and is more frequently referred to by the full name. 

As an additional tribute to the old Dunbar High School, the gymnasium was named the "S.T. Roach Sports Center" for basketball coach Sanford T. Roach, who led the school to a 512–142 record from 1942 to 1965, and is a member of the National High School Sports Hall of Fame and the Kentucky Athletic Hall of Fame. 

The new PLD adopted the original school colors of the old Dunbar High (which were red and black, but changed to green and white during the 1940s). The new high school did not, however, retain the former school's "Bearcats" mascot. A vote of the school's future students shortly before the school's opening favored "Bulldogs" and selected "The Victors", by Louis Elbel, as the basis of the fight song.

Athletics

Paul Laurence Dunbar offers many sports, including football, boys' and girls' basketball, soccer, baseball, softball, boys' lacrosse, tennis, golf, track and field, cheerleading, swimming, dancing, wrestling, and ice hockey.

Basketball 
PLD had a competitive boys' basketball program almost from the beginning. In 1993 the team, led by Darnell Burton, were State Runners-Up, and in 1994, led by Cameron Mills, the team repeated as State Runners-Up. In 1997 the team again reached the Sweet Sixteen, losing in the first round.

The Bulldogs boys basketball team captured the 2016 KHSAA Boys Sweet 16 Championship over Doss 61–52.  PLD was led by tournament MVP Tavieon Hollingsworth.

Football 
The first football playoff appearance was in 1995. For the first five and a half years, the PLD football team played their "home" games at other Lexington high schools. Midway through the 1999 season, PLD's football stadium opened, and that year the school advanced to the playoffs for the second time. In 1996 they were the AAA state runners-up, losing the championship game in overtime.

The football stadium was later named for Jon R. Akers, PLD's first principal and the father of National Football League placekicker David Akers.

Swimming 
The Swim Team has three state championships. Dunbar has dominated their region winning multiple region titles. In 2016, PLD was runner up in team scores at the KHSAA Swimming and Diving Championships. This is a strong sport at the high school with the multiple regional titles and the 5 star elite athletes.

Soccer 
Dunbar has 6 state championships in soccer. In 1992, 2001, 2005 and 2013 PLD Soccer were the State Champions. The first four championships were under Todd Bretz, who was the head coach since the program's inception with one of the highest records of any Kentucky high school soccer coaches (493-169-38), until Fayette County schools sidelined him in September 2019. Zach Byrd also won a Kentucky Mr. Soccer in 2010 when Dunbar lost in the elite eight against Henry Clay. Dunbar won back to back state championships in 2021 and 2022 under coach James Wray.

Cheerleading 
PLD Cheerleading is nationally competitive. They have been UCA National Champions in the Large Varsity Division (all girls) in 1995, 2004–2008, 2011 and 2013. They are the only squad to ever be national champions five times in a row. They were UCA National Runners-Up in 1994, 2002, 2003, 2017 and Third Place in 1993 and 2009, Cheersports National Champions in 2003, KAPOS State Champions in 1994, 1997, 2000–2013, and KHSAA State Champions in 2016 and 2017.  

They have been nationally ranked for twelve years and have been featured in American Cheerleader magazine. 

In 2001, MTV's True Life series prominently featured Dunbar's cheerleading team in the episode "I'm a Cheerleader." On November 28, 2005, Lifetime Television announced a reality series featuring the PLD cheerleaders, and "Cheerleader Nation" premiered in early 2006.

Baseball 
In 2003, PLD Baseball were state champions. That year they also set a Kentucky record for the most wins in one season, winning 41 games and losing only 4. Josh Ellis went a perfect 12–0 in 2003, despite knee injury suffered in a PLD football game, and was named Kentucky's Mr. Baseball. Dunbar was once again state champions in 2007, where they finished with a 38–6 record, and a state record 1.32 ERA.

Track and field 
In 2005, the girls' track and field team tied as AAA state champions.

Both the boys' and girls' teams have won the Lexington City Championships each year since 2000. The boys placed second in 2007 to Henry Clay High School in a loss by 3 points.  The girls won Region 5 AAA in 2001, 2006, and 2007.

Cross country 
Laura Steinmetz was the girls AAA individual state champion in 2005 and 2006. The girls team were AAA state champions in 2005 and placed third in 2006.

Lacrosse 
Lacrosse is not sanctioned by the KHSAA. Dunbar's team went undefeated and won first place in the 2009 Bluegrass State Games, the first time lacrosse was included in the Games. In the 2011 season, the Dunbar lacrosse team broke a 7-year streak of losses to Lexington Catholic in the second round of the state tournament. They went 12–2 and concluded their season with a 9–7 victory over Ballard in the D-II Championship game. In 2015 the lacrosse team was runner up, losing to Henry Clay in the Championship Game.

Ice hockey 
Like lacrosse, ice hockey is not sanctioned by KHSAA. Dunbar's team began as a combination of travel and house league players in 2001, and are one of ten teams in the state of Kentucky. However, in 2002 the PLD Ice Hockey team went from being a "metro" team to a strictly all Dunbar student team with the help of PE/Health teacher Mr. Jonas. Dunbar ice hockey has played in both the "A" (varsity) and "B" (junior varsity) levels of Kentucky state hockey.

Music

The Paul Laurence Dunbar band, has earned national acclaim; they are one of a handful of high school band programs to receive the Sudler Shield award twice, for outstanding high school marching band. The Dunbar band earned the title of state champion in years 1991 (Class AAA), 2003 and 2004 (Class AAAA), and 2005, 2007, 2010, and 2011 (Class AAAAA), and State Runners-Up in 1992, 1994, 1995, and 2002 (Class AAAA), and 2006 and 2008 (Class AAAAA). The band was a finalist in 1993, 1996–1999, 2001 (AAAA), 2009, and 2012–2015 (AAAAA). 

The band performed twice in the Macy's Thanksgiving Day Parade in New York City: first in 2007 and again in the 2014.

Notable alumni
Band

 Kelly Pratt (1992–1996) – Trumpet player, composer

Fencing

 Lee Kiefer (2009–2012) – Four-time NCAA champion, ten-time team Pan American champion, nine-time individual Pan American champion, 2018 team world champion, three-time Olympian, and 2021 individual Olympic champion.

Journalism

 Gil Duran is the California opinion editor for The Sacramento Bee and the former Press Secretary for California governor Jerry Brown.

Baseball

 A. J. Ellis (1995–99) – A two-time first team All-City selection, A.J. was drafted by the Los Angeles Dodgers in 2003, has played for on all minor-league levels for the Dodgers, and made his debut for the Dodgers in 2008 as a pinch-runner for Nomar Garciaparra. He was traded to the Philadelphia Phillies for the 2016 season.

Basketball

 Darnell Burton (1990–93) – Scored 1,017 points in 1993 (11th all-time in Kentucky), starter at the University of Cincinnati.

Soccer

 Sean Kelley (2002–06) – Named Kentucky's Mr. Soccer, an NSCAA HS All-American, and the Gatorade Player of the Year as a senior, while leading his team to a state championship.

See also
 Douglass School (Lexington, Kentucky)
 Russell School (Lexington, Kentucky)

References

External links
 Paul Laurence Dunbar High School Band website
 Math, Science, and Technology Center website

Educational institutions established in 1990
Public high schools in Kentucky
Schools in Lexington, Kentucky
1990 establishments in Kentucky